The Department of Tourism and Resorts of Adjara A. R. (DTRA) is a sub departmental establishment of government of Adjara Autonomous Republic that is mainly involved in a state management of tourism and resorts in the region.
The department carries out a state policy in reserving and developing tourism and resorts. It also popularizes touristic potential of the region on an international level and favors implementation of various innovations in tourism sphere.

Management structure 

The Department is managed by the Chairman Mamia Berdzenishvili. Public Relations Manager and Statutory auditor are the assistants of the chairman. There are 6 divisions in the department:
Administrative Division
Marketing and Advertising Division
Tourist Product and Service Division
Information Technology and Online Projects Division (ITOP)
Statistics Division
Accountancy Division

Each division has a head of the division who are subordinated to The First Deputy Chairman and Deputy Chairman of the department.

Tourism projects 
Expo Batumi 2011
Audio Guides Service
Tourism Week 2012
Share Your Love of Batumi  - Summer, 2013
The Season of Unparalleled Discounts, 2013
Your Summer Starts Here 2014

Tourism slogans 

Evergreen Memories (2007–12)
Visit, Feel it, Love it! (2013–14)

References

External links 
DTRA Official at Citizen's Portal
Official Visitor Guide to Batumi
Official Visitor Guide to Georgia
Official Facebook Page

Politics of Adjara
Adjara
Tourism in Georgia (country)